The 1st Golden Satellite Awards, given by the International Press Academy, were awarded on January 15, 1997. The ceremony was hosted by Stacy Keach.

Special achievement awards 
Mary Pickford Award (for outstanding contribution to the entertainment industry) – Rod Steiger

Outstanding Contribution to New Media – Bill Gates

Outstanding New Talent – Arie Verveen

Motion picture winners and nominees

Best Actor – Drama 
 Geoffrey Rush – Shine as David Helfgott (TIE)  James Woods – Killer: A Journal of Murder as Carl Panzram (TIE)
 Christopher Eccleston – Jude as Jude Fawley
 Ralph Fiennes – The English Patient as László Almásy
 William H. Macy – Fargo as Jerry Lundergaard
 Billy Bob Thornton – Sling Blade as Karl Childers

Best Actor – Musical or Comedy 
 Tom Cruise – Jerry Maguire as Jerry Maguire
 Nathan Lane – The Birdcage as Albert Goldman
 Eddie Murphy – The Nutty Professor as Sherman Klump
 Jack Nicholson – Mars Attacks! as President James Dale
 Stanley Tucci – Big Night as Secondo

Best Actress – Drama 
 Frances McDormand – Fargo as Marge Gunderson
 Brenda Blethyn – Secrets & Lies as Cynthia Purley
 Kristin Scott Thomas – The English Patient as Katharine Clifton
 Emily Watson – Breaking the Waves as Bess McNeill
 Robin Wright Penn – Moll Flanders as Moll Flanders

Best Actress – Musical or Comedy 
 Gwyneth Paltrow – Emma as Emma Woodhouse
 Glenn Close – 101 Dalmatians as Cruella de Vil
 Shirley MacLaine – Mrs. Winterbourne as Grace Winterbourne
 Heather Matarazzo – Welcome to the Dollhouse as Dawn Wiener
 Bette Midler – The First Wives Club as Brenda Morelli-Cushman

Best Animated or Mixed Media Film 
 The Hunchback of Notre Dame
 James and the Giant Peach
 Mars Attacks!
 Muppet Treasure Island
 Space Jam

Best Art Direction 
 Romeo + Juliet – Catherine Martin
 The English Patient
 Evita
 Hamlet
 The Portrait of a Lady

Best Cinematography 
 The English Patient – John Seale
 Breaking the Waves
 Evita
 Hamlet
 Romeo + Juliet

Best Costume Design 
 Evita – Penny Rose
 Hamlet
 Moll Flanders
 The Portrait of a Lady
 Ridicule

Best Director 
 Joel Coen – Fargo
 Scott Hicks – Shine
 Mike Leigh – Secrets & Lies
 Anthony Minghella – The English Patient
 Lars von Trier – Breaking the Waves

Best Editing 
 Independence Day – David Brenner
 The English Patient
 Fargo
 Mission: Impossible
 Romeo + Juliet

Best Film – Drama 
 Fargo
 The English Patient
 Lone Star
 Secrets & Lies
 Shine
 Trainspotting

Best Film – Musical or Comedy 
 Evita
 Cold Comfort Farm
 Everyone Says I Love You
 Flirting with Disaster
 Swingers

Best Foreign Language Film 
 Breaking the Waves, Denmark
 Bitter Sugar (Azúcar amarga), Cuba
 A Judgement in Stone (Le cérémonie), France
 Kolya (Kolja), Czech Republic
 Prisoner of the Mountains (Kavkazskiy plennik), Russia
 Ridicule, France

Best Original Score 
 "The English Patient" – Gabriel Yared
 "Hamlet" – Patrick Doyle
 "Mars Attacks!" – Danny Elfman
 "Michael Collins" – Elliot Goldenthal
 "Sling Blade" – Daniel Lanois

Best Original Song 
 "You Must Love Me" performed by Madonna – Evita
 "God Give Me Strength" performed by Kristen Vigard – Grace of My Heart
 "Kissing You" performed by Des'ree – Romeo + Juliet
 "That Thing You Do" performed by The Wonders – That Thing You Do!
 "Walls" performed by Tom Petty – She's the One

Best Screenplay – Adapted 
 The English Patient – Anthony Minghella
 The Crucible – Arthur Miller
 Jude – Hossein Amini
 The Portrait of a Lady – Laura Jones
 Trainspotting – John Hodge

Best Screenplay – Original 
 Lone Star – John Sayles (TIE)  The People vs. Larry Flynt – Scott Alexander and Larry Karaszewski (TIE)
 Fargo – Joel Coen and Ethan Coen
 Shine – Jan Sardi
 Sling Blade – Billy Bob Thornton

Best Supporting Actor – Drama 
 Armin Mueller-Stahl – Shine as Peter
 Steve Buscemi – Fargo as Carl Showalter
 Robert Carlyle – Trainspotting as Francis "Franco" Begbie
 Jeremy Irons – Stealing Beauty as Alex Parrish
 John Lynch – Moll Flanders as Jonathan
 Paul Scofield – The Crucible as Thomas Danforth

Best Supporting Actor – Musical or Comedy 
 Cuba Gooding Jr. – Jerry Maguire as Rod Tidwell
 Woody Allen – Everyone Says I Love You as Joe Berlin
 Danny DeVito – Matilda as Harry Wormwood
 Gene Hackman – The Birdcage as Senator Kevin Keeley
 Ian McKellen – Cold Comfort Farm as Amos Starkader

Best Supporting Actress – Drama 
 Courtney Love – The People vs. Larry Flynt as Althea Flynt
 Joan Allen – The Crucible as Elizabeth Proctor
 Stockard Channing – Moll Flanders as Mrs. Allworthy
 Miranda Richardson – The Evening Star as Patsy Carpenter
 Kate Winslet – Hamlet as Ophelia

Best Supporting Actress – Musical or Comedy 
 Debbie Reynolds – Mother as Beatrice Henderson
 Lauren Bacall – The Mirror Has Two Faces as Hannah Morgan
 Goldie Hawn – Everyone Says I Love You as Skylar Dandridge
 Sarah Jessica Parker – The First Wives Club as Shelly Stewart
 Renée Zellweger – Jerry Maguire as Dorothy Boyd

Best Visual Effects 
 Independence Day – Volker Engel and Douglas Smith
 Dragonheart
 Mars Attacks!
 Star Trek: First Contact
 Twister

Television winners and nominees

Best Actor – Drama Series 
 David Duchovny – The X-Files as Fox Mulder
 Andre Braugher – Homicide: Life on the Street as Frank Pembleton
 Anthony Edwards – ER as Mark Greene
 Hector Elizondo – Chicago Hope as Phillip Watters
 Dennis Franz – NYPD Blue as Andy Sipowicz

Best Actor – Musical or Comedy Series 
 John Lithgow – 3rd Rock from the Sun as Dick Solomon
 Michael J. Fox – Spin City as Mike Flaherty
 Michael Richards – Seinfeld as Cosmo Kramer
 Garry Shandling – The Larry Sanders Show as Larry Sanders
 Rip Torn – The Larry Sanders Show as Artie

Best Actor – Miniseries or TV Film 
 Alan Rickman – Rasputin: Dark Servant of Destiny as Grigori Rasputin
 Beau Bridges – Hidden in America as Bill Januson
 Ted Danson – Gulliver's Travels as Lemuel Gulliver
 Eric Roberts – In Cold Blood as Perry Edward Smith
 James Woods – The Summer of Ben Tyler as Temple Rayburn

Best Actress – Drama Series 
 Christine Lahti – Chicago Hope as Kate Austin
 Gillian Anderson – The X-Files as Dana Scully
 Kim Delaney – NYPD Blue as Diane Russell
 Julianna Margulies – ER as Carol Hathaway
 Kimberly Williams-Paisley – Relativity as Isabel Lukens

Best Actress – Musical or Comedy Series 
 Jane Curtin – 3rd Rock from the Sun as Mary Albright
 Fran Drescher – The Nanny as Fran Fine
 Helen Hunt – Mad About You as Jamie Buchman
 Cybill Shepherd – Cybill as Cybill Sheridan
 Lea Thompson – Caroline in the City as Caroline Duffy

Best Actress – Miniseries or TV Film 
 Helen Mirren – Prime Suspect 5: Errors of Judgment
 Kirstie Alley – Suddenly
 Lolita Davidovich – Harvest on Fire
 Laura Dern – The Siege at Ruby Ridge
 Jena Malone – Hidden in America

Best Miniseries or TV Film 
 Gulliver's Travels
 If These Walls Could Talk
 Pride and Prejudice
 The Siege at Ruby Ridge
 The Summer of Ben Tyler

Best Series – Drama 
 The X-Files
 Chicago Hope
 ER
 Homicide: Life on the Street
 NYPD Blue

Best Series – Musical or Comedy 
 The Larry Sanders Show
 3rd Rock from the Sun
 Cybill
 Seinfeld
 Spin City

Best Supporting Actor – (Mini)Series or TV Film 
 Stanley Tucci – Murder One
 Brian Dennehy – A Season in Purgatory
 Ian McKellen – Rasputin: Dark Servant of Destiny
 Anthony Quinn – Gotti
 Treat Williams – The Late Shift

Best Supporting Actress – (Mini)Series or TV Film 
 Kathy Bates – The Late Shift
 Cher – If These Walls Could Talk
 Gail O'Grady – NYPD Blue
 Greta Scacchi – Rasputin: Dark Servant of Destiny
 Alfre Woodard – Gulliver's Travels

New Media winners and nominees

Best Home Entertainment Product/Game 
Super Mario 64
 Die Hard Trilogy
 John Madden Football 1996 (Electronic Arts)
 Nights (Sega)
 Tekken 2

CD-ROM Educational – Children 
101 Dalmatians Storybook
 Freddi Fish 2: The Case of the Haunted Schoolhouse
 Living Books: Sheila Rae, The Brave
 The Simpsons: Cartoon Studio
 Snoopy's Campfire Stories

CD-ROM Entertainment 
Cinemania 97
 Encarta 97 – Encyclopedia Deluxe
 Eyewitness Encyclopedia of Space and the Universe
 Inside Independence Day
 Leonardo da Vinci

CD-ROM Game 
Monty Python & the Quest for the Holy Grail
 Descent II
 Goosebumps
 Quake
 Warcraft II: Beyond the Dark Portal

Awards breakdown

Film 
Winners:
3 / 5 Evita: Best Costume Design / Best Film – Musical or Comedy / Best Original Song
3 / 7 Fargo: Best Director / Best Actress & Film – Drama
3 / 9 The English Patient: Best Adapted Screenplay / Best Cinematography / Best Original Score
2 / 2 Independence Day: Best Editing / Best Visual Effects
2 / 2 The People vs. Larry Flynt: Best Screenplay – Original / Best Supporting Actress – Drama
2 / 3 Jerry Maguire: Best Actor & Supporting Actor – Musical or Comedy
2 / 5 Shine: Best Actor & Supporting Actor – Drama
1 / 1 Emma: Best Actress – Musical or Comedy
1 / 1 The Hunchback of Notre Dame: Best Animated or Mixed Media Film
1 / 1 Killer: A Journal of Murder: Best Actor – Drama
1 / 1 Mother: Best Supporting Actress – Musical or Comedy
1 / 2 Lone Star: Best Screenplay – Original
1 / 4 Breaking the Waves: Best Foreign Language Film
1 / 4 Romeo + Juliet: Best Art Direction

Losers:
0 / 5 Hamlet
0 / 4 Mars Attacks!, Moll Flanders
0 / 3 The Crucible, Everyone Says I Love You, The Portrait of a Lady, Sling Blade, Secrets & Lies, Trainspotting
0 / 2 The Birdcage, Cold Comfort Farm, The First Wives Club, Jude, Ridicule

Television 
Winners:
2 / 3 3rd Rock from the Sun: Best Actor & Actress – Musical or Comedy Series
2 / 3 The X-Files: Best Actor – Drama Series / Best Series – Drama
1 / 1 Murder One: Best Supporting Actor – (Mini)Series or TV Film
1 / 1 Prime Suspect 5: Errors of Judgment: Best Actress – Miniseries or TV Film
1 / 2 The Late Shift: Best Supporting Actress – (Mini)Series or TV Film
1 / 3 Chicago Hope: Best Actress – Drama Series
1 / 3 Gulliver's Travels: Best Miniseries or TV Film
1 / 3 The Larry Sanders Show: Best Series – Musical or Comedy
1 / 3 Rasputin: Dark Servant of Destiny: Best Actor – Miniseries or TV Film

Losers:
0 / 4 NYPD Blue
0 / 3 ER
0 / 2 Cybill, Hidden in America, Homicide: Life on the Street, If These Walls Could Talk, Seinfeld, The Siege at Ruby Ridge, Spin City, The Summer of Ben Tyler

References 
 Satellite Awards – IMDb

External links
1997 1st Annual SATELLITE™ Awards Nominees and Winners

Satellite Awards ceremonies
1997 film awards
1997 television awards
1997 awards in the United States
1997 in American television
1997 in American cinema